The Stack's Mountains are a mountain range about seven kilometres northeast of Tralee, along the N69 road in County Kerry in Ireland.

The highest peak in the range is Crusline, which is 355 metres high. Nearby summits include Ballincollig Hill (353 m), Beennageeha Mountain (321 m), and Stack's Mountain (323 m).

Landscape and nature
The range is characterised by moorland and limited open pasture, with 4,700 hectares of young coniferous forest plantations of mainly Sitka spruce – with Japanese larch, pines, firs and cedars, along with some broadleaved trees such as birch, ash, alder, oak, willow, sycamore, and holly – most managed by the forest management company, Coillte.

The local conifer forests, open heather moors, and grassland are habitats for fauna such as the hen harrier, Irish hare, red fox, red grouse, snipe, cuckoo, and meadow pipit. The neighbouring Glanaruddery Mountains to the southeast are divided from the Stack's Mountains by the valley of the Smearlagh River.

Energy resources
The peat company, Bord na Móna, extracted about 250,000 tons of turf from Lyracrumpane Bog between 1938 and 1963. Nowadays, turf is harvested by local people under turbary arrangements, using hopper machines instead of the traditional slane. There are also wind farms on Stack's Mountain and Ballincollig Hill.

Recreation
The Lyracrumpane Development Association in cooperation with Coillte have created the four-mile "Mass Path and River Walk" along the banks of the Smearlagh River, and the ten mile "Fionn MacCumhaill" trek through open countryside and Coillte forest plantations.

The seven-mile Smearlagh River, which is a tributary of the River Feale, is formed in the Stack's Mountains and Glanaruddery Mountains from the Broghane Stream, Dromaddamore River, Glashoreag River, and Lyracrumpane River. The Smearlagh meets the Feale at Inchymagilleragh, three miles east of Listowel, where the confluence is known as "The Joinings". The Smearlagh is a swift river that provides good salmon and sea trout fishing.

References

External links

 Ballincollig Hill wind farm in Google Street View
 Lyreacrompane Sliabh Luachra Rural Development Group
 Lyreacrompane at "1st Stop County Kerry"

Mountains and hills of County Kerry